Audrey Dana (born 21 September 1977) is a French actress and film director.

Life and career
Dana studied drama in Orléans and Paris. After two years in New York City, she went back to France where she acted in various plays, including Nos amis, les humains by Bernard Werber. She was also cast in the movie adaptations Nos amis les Terriens, and Roman de Gare by Claude Lelouch. In 2008, she was nominated for the César Award for Most Promising Actress and was awarded the Prix Romy Schneider. Dana and her ex-husband, French film director Mabrouk El Mechri, have a son Lee who was born in 2008.

Her directorial debut Sous les jupes des filles was released on 4 June 2014.

Filmography

As actress
 Tranches de vie by François Leterrier
 Joséphine, ange gardien TV Series (1 Episode : "Un passé pour l'avenir")
 Nos amis les Terriens by Bernard Werber (2006)
 Roman de gare by Claude Lelouch (2007)
 To Each His Own Cinema, in the short film by Claude Lelouch (2007)
 Ce soir je dors chez toi by Olivier Baroux (2007)
 Welcome by Philippe Lioret (2009)
 Ah! La libido by Michèle Rosier (2009)
 Tellement proches by Olivier Nakache & Éric Toledano (2009)
 The Clink of Ice by Bertrand Blier (2010)
 Torpedo by Matthieu Donck (2012)
 Paris Follies by Marc Fitoussi (2014)
 Sous les jupes des filles by Audrey Dana (2014)
 Boomerang by François Favrat (2015)
 French Cuisine by Florent Siri (2015)
 Knock by Lorraine Lévy (2017)
  Si j'étais un homme (2017)
 The Accusation by Yvan Attal (2021)

As director
 5 à 7 (Short film) (2009) 
 Sous les jupes des filles (2014)
 Si j'étais un homme (2017)
 Hommes au bord de la crise de nerfs (2022)

References

External links

 
 

1977 births
Living people
French film actresses
French stage actresses
21st-century French actresses
French people of Tunisian descent
French film directors
French women film directors
French women screenwriters
French screenwriters